S.T. Quadri (10 October 1932 - 15 November 2005) is an Indian politician and Member of Parliament (MP), represented the Shimoga constituency in 7th Lok Sabha, the lower house of the Indian Parliament. He was nominated as the Director of Salem Steel Plant in Tamil Nadu by the Government of India in 1976.

Early life and background 
Quadri was born on 10 October 1932 in Koppal of Raichur district. Syed Sirajul Hassan Quadri was his father. He completed his education from Osmania University, Hyderabad.

Personal life 
S.T. Quadri was married Banu Begum on 7 May 1953 and the couple has 3 sons and 3 daughters.

Positions held 

 Member of Karnataka State Haj Committee.

Death 
He died at the age of 73 in Mysore, Karnataka on 15 Nov 2005.

References 

1932 births
2005 deaths
Indian National Congress politicians from Karnataka
People from Raichur district
Karnataka politicians
Lok Sabha members from Karnataka
India MPs 1980–1984
Indian National Congress politicians
People from Shimoga district